Katrina Elizabeth Leskanich (born April 10, 1960) is an American musician and the former lead singer of the pop rock band Katrina and the Waves. Their song "Walking on Sunshine" was an international hit in 1985. In 1997, the band won the Eurovision Song Contest for the United Kingdom with the song "Love Shine a Light".  Both of those songs were written by her long-term bandmate Kimberly Rew.

Early life 
Leskanich was born in Topeka, Kansas. Her father was a Vietnam Veteran who became a colonel in the United States Air Force. Katrina and her five siblings (four sisters and one brother) moved frequently as children. The family arrived in the United Kingdom in 1976. She graduated from RAF Lakenheath high school in 1978.

Early career 
Mama's Cookin', a pop cover band hailing from Feltwell, Norfolk, England, was founded in 1978. It featured Leskanich on vocals and keyboards, her then-boyfriend (and fellow American) Vince de la Cruz on vocals and lead guitar, and Marcos de la Cruz on drums. By late 1980, Alex Cooper had joined the band on drums, with Bob Jakins on bass. Mama's Cookin' proceeded to gig steadily in England over the next two years, specializing in covers of songs by American acts.

In 1981, singer/songwriter/guitarist Kimberley Rew joined Mama's Cookin', and the five-piece group was quickly renamed The Waves after a band Rew and Cooper had been in together in the mid-1970s. The Waves were initially fronted by Rew. However, over the first year of the Waves' existence, Rew began to write material for Leskanich to sing, and she was soon the primary vocalist. The Waves made their initial recorded appearances on a 1982 single ("Nightmare"/"Hey, War Pig!"); both tracks were included on the 1982 Rew solo album called The Bible of Bop. The Waves then issued their debut EP, Shock Horror!, later in 1982.  Around this time, bassist Jakins left the band. He was not replaced, as de la Cruz took over on bass and the band was rechristened Katrina and the Waves.

Katrina and the Waves

Early Canadian success (1983–84) 
In early 1983, the fledgling band recorded—at their own expense—an LP of their original material designed to be sold at gigs.  Rew wrote all the songs on this LP, while Leskanich sang eight of the album's ten tracks.

The LP was shopped around to various labels, but only Attic Records in Canada responded with an offer. Consequently, although they were based in England, Katrina and The Waves' first album Walking on Sunshine was released only in Canada.

The album garnered enough critical attention and radio play to merit a Canadian tour.  In 1984, the group released a follow-up album in Canada (Katrina and the Waves 2), with Leskanich now handling all the lead vocals. Also in 1984, their song "Going Down to Liverpool" was covered by The Bangles, which added to their profile. With the group building a fan base with their recordings and extensive touring, major label interest began to build, and Katrina and the Waves signed an international deal with Capitol Records in 1985.

"Walking on Sunshine" and international success (1985–89) 

The band re-recorded, remixed, or overdubbed 10 songs from their earlier Canadian releases to create their self-titled international debut album in 1985.

The Katrina and the Waves album was a substantial critical and commercial success, and the group had a worldwide hit with the song "Walking on Sunshine," (No. 9 US, No. 8 UK, a completely re-recorded, and substantially rearranged version of the song when compared to its initial 1983 Canada-only release).  A Grammy award nomination for "Best New Artist" followed, as did constant touring, both of which helped to spur sales of new releases. A follow-up single to "Walking on Sunshine" called "Do You Want Crying" (written by de la Cruz) also became a top 40 US hit, reaching No. 37 in the late summer of 1985.

The band's follow-up album, entitled Waves, did not meet with the same measure of success as the first album. The album did spin off a minor UK and US hit in the form of the Rew-penned "Is That It?" (No. 70 US, No. 82 UK). "Sun Street" (a de la Cruz composition) was a UK Top 30 hit in 1986. However, Capitol dropped the band after the Waves album failed to meet expectations.  The band subsequently recorded a 1989 album for Capitol-distributed SBK Records called Break of Hearts, a harder, more rock-oriented effort than their previous releases.  The album included "That's the Way", which reached No. 16 in the US.

Downturn, comeback, and breakup (1990–97) 
Throughout the 1990s, Katrina and the Waves recorded fairly steadily, though most releases were available only in continental Europe and/or Canada. They also recorded the song "We Gotta Get Out of This Place" with Eric Burdon for the TV series China Beach in 1990.

On May 3, 1997, after having somewhat faded into obscurity, the band won the Eurovision Song Contest 1997 for the United Kingdom with "Love Shine a Light". Reacting to the win, Leskanich said it was the second landslide victory in a week; the song won by a record points margin, and Tony Blair had won the 1997 British general election two days previously. The song won by a then-record margin of 70 points over the Irish runner-up. The song went to No. 3 in the UK Singles Chart (becoming the band's biggest-ever hit) and Katrina and The Waves performed an unprecedented four weeks running on the BBC One TV show Top of the Pops.

Katrina and the Waves broke up in 1999.

"Walking on Sunshine" has been used in many advertisements and films, including:
 Ask Max (1986) Disney movie
 Secret of My Success (1987) Michael J Fox – walking on the treadmill
 Look Who's Talking (1989) danced to on-screen by John Travolta
 Bean (1997)
 High Fidelity (2000) danced to by Jack Black
 American Psycho (2000) with Christian Bale – to tone down a dark event
 The Master of Disguise (2002)
 Daddy Day Care (2003) Eddie Murphy – opening sequence
 Walking on Sunshine (2014) Leona Lewis in musical featuring upbeat 1980s songs

Katrina and The Waves' song covers include:

 Bangles "Going Down to Liverpool" (1984)
 Dolly Parton "Walking on Sunshine" on her Treasures album (1996)
 Celine Dion "That's Just The Woman in Me" (2008)
 Glee cast mash up of "Walking on Sunshine" and Beyonce "Halo" (2010)
 "Walking on Sunshine" has also been featured several times on American Idol, X Factor and The Voice.

Solo career 
After the Waves broke up in 1999, Leskanich launched a solo career. She released her first solo CD, Katrina Leskanich, through Universal Records in Britain in 2005.

In February 2005, Laskanich participated in the Melodifestivalen 2005 which is the pre-selection for Sweden's Eurovision Song Contest entry. She did a duet with the band 'The Nameless' in the 4th semi final. Their song 'As If Tomorrow Will Never Come' came 3rd in the semi final, progressing to the Second Chance round where they came 6th and did not qualify for the final.

In 2005, Leskanich reflected on sharing her name with a hurricane that devastated the U.S. Gulf Coast in late August and early September of that year, after the name "Katrina and the Waves" appeared on numerous news television shows, headlines, and blog postings that were covering her namesake hurricane. When a New York Times reporter contacted her about this, she said: "The first time I opened the paper and saw 'Katrina kills 9,' it was a bit of a shock. ... I hope that the true spirit of 'Walking on Sunshine' will prevail. I would hate for the title to be tinged with sadness, and I will have to do my own part to help turn that around." She also stated that she hoped that "Walking on Sunshine" would become an anthem for the Gulf Coast's recovery.

To celebrate the 25th Anniversary of "Walking on Sunshine", Leskanich released her first live album The Live Album, in July 2010.  The album includes both a live version and a blues version of "Walking on Sunshine". "I have performed 'Walking on Sunshine' for so many years in so many different countries that it's become the one constant in my life and the one thing I can count on to bring happiness to myself and others," said Leskanich.

In September 2010, Leskanich re-released her solo album Turn The Tide with two bonus tracks: the club mix of "They Don't Know" and the Espirito mix of "Walking on Sunshine". In May 2011, Leskanich released an EP entitled Spiritualize. "In 1999 I wrote, collected and compiled some songs I thought would come together for an uplifting and spiritual type of album. I thought I'd try to make this a bit more personal," said Leskanich.

In 2013, Leskanich and her new band performed at festivals in the UK and Europe, including the San Fermín festival in Pamplona in Spain on Plaza del Castillo, and the Steinegg Festival in Italy. In 2014, Leskanich, a firm believer in animal rights, supported Wildlife Rocks with an acoustic performance. Other performers included Queen lead guitarist and founder of the Save Me organization, Brian May. The event raised awareness for vital wildlife projects, and was attended by several members of Parliament.

Leskanich released her second solo album, Blisland, which was inspired by the genre of music from her formative years. "I wanted to record an album that reflected my love of all the genres of music I grew up listening to, from Peter Frampton Live (sic) to Neil Young's Harvest. I fell in love with the South West of England; the beautiful beaches reminded me of California, and a little village called Blisland not only had a fantastic little pub but also gave me the perfect name for my new album."

2014 Leskanich toured North America on the Retro Futura Tour with other 80s artists including Thompson Twins, Tom Bailey, Howard Jones, Midge Ure and China Crisis In 2015 Leskanich toured South Africa on the Rewind Tour and toured on her own in North America.

In 2016, Leskanich took part in the BBC's Eurovision: You Decide, toured Australia on the 'Totally 80s' Tour and toured in Sweden during the summer.

Leskanich toured the US with the Retro Futura Tour 2017 with 80s artists including Howard Jones, Paul Young, The English Beat and Modern English and in May 2017 released her first compilation album, The Very Best of Katrina. In 2018 Leskanich released her first Christmas single, "I Can't Give You Anything but Love".

The Eurovision Song Contest 2020 was cancelled due to the COVID-19 pandemic, and therefore the EBU decided to organize Eurovision: Europe Shine a Light as an alternative. The name was inspired by the song "Love Shine a Light" by Katrina and the Waves which won the Eurovision Song Contest 1997. Closing the show, most of the artists performed "Love Shine a Light" from their respective home countries with Leskanich singing the last line.

In July 2020, Leskanich released the single "Drive" which garnered many plays on BBC Radio 2 and BBC local radio stations. This was followed by the release of her album, Hearts, Loves & Babys  and a second single, "I Want to Love Again".

Other work and personal life 
She is married to Sher Harper with whom she entered into a civil union in 2008 in England. Harper is also Leskanich's professional manager.

Leskanich and Harper co-wrote Peggy Lee Loves London – My London Guide (2013), a quirky photographic guidebook about London. In 2018, Leskanich and Harper released a new dog-friendly travel guide, Metropoodle: My Cornwall Guide, on Amazon Kindle.

Discography

Solo

Solo albums 
Turn the Tide Limited release 2004
Katrina Leskanich released in 2006 – Universal Distribution
The Live Album digital release July 2010
Turn the Tide digital re-release with bonus tracks September 2010
Spiritualize digital release May 2011
Blisland digital release August 19, 2014
The Very Best of Katrina digital release May 3, 2017
Hearts, Loves & Babys digital release August 28, 2020

Compilations 
We Gotta Get out of This Place with Eric Burdon – China Beach 1989 SBK
Ride of Your Life – Return to the Centre of the Earth (Rick Wakeman) 1999 EMI
Scar – This Is Not Retro – This Is the Eighties Up to Date 2005
They Don't Know – Gylne tider 2 2007 Sony BMG
Hitsville UK – The Sandinista Project 2007 3:59 Records
Walking on Sunshine (live and studio version) – Countdown Spectacular 2 (2007) Liberation Blue Records (Australian-only release)

Singles 
"They Don't Know" digital release in 2006
"They Don't Know" Club Mixes – Katrina vs Sleazesisters digital release 2008
"Sun Coming Upper" digital release March 2015
"I Can't Give You Anything but Love" digital release November 2018
"Drive" digital release July 2020
"I Want to Love Again" digital release August 2020
"Holiday" digital release 2022

Other appearances 
"Don't Follow Me" – Hanoi Rocks 1983 – backing vocals
"Torn" – Natalie Imbruglia 1997 – backing vocals
"I Quit" – Hepburn 1998 – backing vocals
"Ride of Your Life" from Return to the Centre of the Earth – Rick Wakeman 1999 – guest vocals
"Help Me Help You" – Holly Valance 2003 – backing vocals

With Katrina and the Waves

Albums 
The Bible of Bop (Kimberley Rew) 1982 Armageddon Records
Shock Horror 1982 (The Waves) Aftermath Records
Walking on Sunshine 1983 Attic Records
The 2nd LP 1984 Attic Records
Katrina & The Waves 1985 Capitol Records
Waves 1986 Capitol Records
Break of Hearts 1989 SBK Records
Pet the Tiger 1991 Virgin Germany
Edge of the Land 1993 Polydor
Turnaround 1994 Polydor
Roses 1995 Polydor
Walk on Water 1997 Warner Music

Best-of albums 
The Best Of 1991 Attic Records
Anthology 1995 One Way Records
KATW/Waves 1996 BGO Records
Premium Gold Collection 1997 EMI
Greatest Hits of 1997 EMI
Walking on Sunshine 1997 Polygram Records
The Original Recordings 2003 BongoBeat Records

Singles 
"The Nightmare" 1982 (The Waves) Armagedon Records
"Brown Eyed Son" 1982 (The Waves) Albion Records
"Plastic Man" 1984 Silvertown Records
"Walking on Sunshine" 1985 Capitol Records
"Red Wine & Whisky" 1985 Capitol Records
"Do You Want Crying?" 1985 Capitol Records
"Que te quiero" 1985 Capitol Records
"Mexico" 1985 Capitol Records
"Is That It" 1986 Capitol Records
"Tears for Me" 1986 Capitol Records
"Lovely Lindsey" 1986 Capitol Records
"Sun Street" 1986 Capitol Records
"That's the Way" 1989 SBK Records
"Rock 'n' Roll Girl" 1989 SBK Records
"We Gotta Get out of This Place" 1989 SBK Records
"Pet the Tiger" 1991 Virgin Records
"Tears of a Woman" 1991 Virgin Records
"Birkenhead Garbage Pickers" 1992 Virgin Records
"I'm in Deep" 1993 Polydor
"Cookin'" 1994 Polydor
"The Street Where You Live" 1995 Polydor
"Honey Lamb" 1995 Polydor
"Turnaround" 1995 Polydor
"Walking Where the Roses Grow" 1995 Polydor
"Brown Eyed Son" 1997 Top Line records
"Love Shine a Light" 1997 Warner Music
"Walk on Water" 1997 Warner Music

References

External links 

 KATRINA's official website
 KATRINA Leskanich official YouTube
 KATRINA'S Instagram
 KATRINA on Facebook
 KATRINA on Twitter
 The Sandinista Project

1960 births
Living people
Actors from Topeka, Kansas
American expatriates in the United Kingdom
American women pop singers
American lesbian writers
BBC Radio 2 presenters
Eurovision Song Contest winners
Eurovision Song Contest entrants of 1997
Women new wave singers
Lesbian singers
Lesbian songwriters
Rhythm guitarists
Writers from Topeka, Kansas
Musicians from Topeka, Kansas
Singers from Kansas
Guitarists from Kansas
Katrina and the Waves members
20th-century American women singers
21st-century American women singers
American women radio presenters
1985 singles
1985 albums
20th-century American women guitarists
21st-century American women guitarists
American LGBT singers
American LGBT songwriters
American lesbian musicians
20th-century American LGBT people
21st-century American LGBT people
Melodifestivalen contestants of 2005